In six-dimensional geometry, a stericated 6-cube is a convex uniform 6-polytope, constructed as a sterication (4th order truncation) of the regular 6-cube.

There are 8 unique sterications for the 6-cube with permutations of truncations, cantellations, and runcinations.

Stericated 6-cube

Alternate names 
 Small cellated hexeract (Acronym: scox) (Jonathan Bowers)

Images

Steritruncated 6-cube

Alternate names 
 Cellirhombated hexeract (Acronym: catax) (Jonathan Bowers)

Images

Stericantellated 6-cube

Alternate names 
 Cellirhombated hexeract (Acronym: crax) (Jonathan Bowers)

Images

Stericantitruncated 6-cube

Alternate names 
 Celligreatorhombated hexeract (Acronym: cagorx) (Jonathan Bowers)

Images

Steriruncinated 6-cube

Alternate names 
 Celliprismated hexeract (Acronym: copox) (Jonathan Bowers)

Images

Steriruncitruncated 6-cube

Alternate names 
 Celliprismatotruncated hexeract (Acronym: captix) (Jonathan Bowers)

Images

Steriruncicantellated 6-cube

Alternate names 
 Celliprismatorhombated hexeract (Acronym: coprix) (Jonathan Bowers)

Images

Steriruncicantitruncated 6-cube

Alternate names 
 Great cellated hexeract (Acronym: gocax) (Jonathan Bowers)

Images

Related polytopes

These polytopes are from a set of 63 uniform 6-polytopes generated from the B6 Coxeter plane, including the regular 6-cube or 6-orthoplex.

Notes

References
 H.S.M. Coxeter: 
 H.S.M. Coxeter, Regular Polytopes, 3rd Edition, Dover New York, 1973 
 Kaleidoscopes: Selected Writings of H.S.M. Coxeter, edited by F. Arthur Sherk, Peter McMullen, Anthony C. Thompson, Asia Ivic Weiss, Wiley-Interscience Publication, 1995,  
 (Paper 22) H.S.M. Coxeter, Regular and Semi Regular Polytopes I, [Math. Zeit. 46 (1940) 380-407, MR 2,10]
 (Paper 23) H.S.M. Coxeter, Regular and Semi-Regular Polytopes II, [Math. Zeit. 188 (1985) 559-591]
 (Paper 24) H.S.M. Coxeter, Regular and Semi-Regular Polytopes III, [Math. Zeit. 200 (1988) 3-45]
 Norman Johnson Uniform Polytopes, Manuscript (1991)
 N.W. Johnson: The Theory of Uniform Polytopes and Honeycombs, Ph.D.

External links 
 Polytopes of Various Dimensions
 Multi-dimensional Glossary

6-polytopes